Bend may refer to:

Materials
 Bend, a curvature in a pipe, tube, or pipeline (see Bend radius)
 Bend knot, a knot used to tie two ropes together; see List of bend knots
Bending, the deformation of an object due to an applied load

Music

Musical techniques
 Bend (guitar), a guitar technique
 Bending, for blues harp (harmonica)

Albums and songs
 Bend (8stops7 album), 2006
 Bend (The Origin album), 1992
 "Bend" (song), a 2015 song by Chet Faker

People
 Lin Bend (1922–1978), Canadian ice hockey centre
 Robert Bend (1914–1999), Manitoba politician

Places
 Bend, British Columbia, a railway point in Canada
 Bend, California
 Bend, Missouri
 Bend, Oregon 
 Bend, South Dakota
 Bend, Texas

Other uses
 Bend (heraldry), a diagonal band used as a heraldic charge
 Bend, a meander in a river
 Decompression sickness, commonly known as "the bends"
 Curl (association football), a playing technique also called "bend"

See also
 
 
 Bends (disambiguation)
 Bendable (disambiguation)
 Bender (disambiguation)
 Bending (disambiguation)